Lithocarpus caudatifolius is a tree in the beech family Fagaceae. The specific epithet  is from the Latin meaning "leaf with caudate apex".

Description
The greyish brown bark is smooth, scaly or fissured.

Distribution and habitat
Lithocarpus caudatifolius grows naturally in Borneo, the Philippines and Sulawesi. Its habitat is dipterocarp to lower montane forests up to  altitude.

References

caudatifolius
Trees of Borneo
Trees of the Philippines
Trees of Sulawesi
Plants described in 1908